Tenebrio obscurus, or the dark mealworm beetle, is a species of darkling beetle. The larvae, when used as feeder insects for reptile and amphibian pets, are known as mini mealworm.  These insects should not be confused with younger mealworms (Tenebrio molitor) or with the confused flour beetle (Tribolium confusum), which is also occasionally used as a reptile feeder insect.

Mini mealworms would probably remain largely unknown, if not for the reptile pet industry. In the search for easy to raise insects to use as food for captive reptiles and amphibians, mini mealworms have recently attracted interest as an ideal food item for smaller species.

The larvae resemble very small mealworms, about ½ to ¾ inch (12 to 19 mm) in size. Once they reach adult size, the larvae pupate, and later emerge as small, black beetles.

References

External links 
 A photo of an adult Tenebrio obscurus.
 Information and photos from ZipcodeZoo.com

Tenebrionidae
Pet foods
Beetles described in 1792
Taxa named by Johan Christian Fabricius